Potterhill railway station was a railway station to the south of Paisley, Renfrewshire, Scotland. The station was originally part of the Glasgow and South Western Railway's short-lived Barrhead Branch.

History

The station opened on 1 June 1886, and was closed on 1 January 1917. Although originally an intermediate station on the 3.25 mile line between Paisley West and Barrhead Central, services between Barrhead and Potterhill were terminated in 1913, leaving Potterhill as the branch terminus for the remainder of its life. Freight services continued at this station until 1959.

Footnotes

References
Butt, R.V.J. (1995). The Directory of Railway Stations, Patrick Stephens Ltd, Sparkford. .
Stansfield, G. (1999). Ayrshire & Renfrewshire's Lost Railways, Stenlake Publishing, Catrine. .

Disused railway stations in Renfrewshire
Former Glasgow and South Western Railway stations
Railway stations in Great Britain opened in 1886
Railway stations in Great Britain closed in 1917
Buildings and structures in Paisley, Renfrewshire
Transport in Paisley, Renfrewshire
1886 establishments in Scotland
1917 disestablishments in Scotland